The 1872 Wick Burghs by-election was fought on 28 February 1872.  The byelection was fought due to the Resignation of the incumbent MP of the Liberal Party, George Loch.  It was won by the Liberal candidate John Pender.

References

1872 elections in the United Kingdom
1872 in Scotland
1870s elections in Scotland
19th century in Orkney
Politics of the county of Caithness
Politics of the county of Cromarty
Politics of Orkney
Politics of the county of Ross
Politics of the county of Ross and Cromarty
Politics of the county of Sutherland
By-elections to the Parliament of the United Kingdom in Scottish constituencies